State of Divinity may refer to:
 State of Divinity (1996 TV series), a 1996 Hong Kong television series
 State of Divinity (2000 TV series), a 2000 Taiwanese television series
 The Smiling, Proud Wanderer or State of Divinity, a novel by Jin Yong